Terroreign (Apocalyptic Armageddon Command) is the sixth studio album by Singaporean black metal band Impiety, released in 2009 through Agonia Records. The album is made available as regular jewel case, limited edition digipak with sticker and vinyl. The latter is pressed to 750 limited copies; 100 on white, 400 on regular black LP and the rest 250 copies as picture disc. All vinyl version comes with an A3 landscape poster of Impiety, with some bearing Shyaithan's signature. Both Intro and Outro are composed and performed by Nuclear Holocausto Vengeance of Beherit.

Track listing

Credits 
 Shyaithan – vocals, bass, guitars, lyrics
 Rangel Arroyo – Guitar
 Tremor – Drums
 Oscar Garcia – drums (Live)
 Recorded and mixed from February to March 2009 at Sound 47 Studios Singapore and Lab 6 Brazil
 Produced by Shyaithan
 Engineered, mixed and mastered by Nizam
 All bass and guitars on this album by Shyaithan
 All lead solos by Rangel Arroyo
 My Dark Subconscious is originally recorded by Morbid
 Intro and Outro composed by Holocausto Vengeance of Beherit
 Intro and Outro voices by Shyaithan
 Cover and entire artwork by Thiti – Imperial Sickness666
 Layout by Lord Perversor
Logo by Christophe Szpajdel

2009 albums
Impiety (band) albums